Our Vines Have Tender Grapes is a 1945 American drama film directed by Roy Rowland and starring Edward G. Robinson and Margaret O'Brien.

Background
The film is based on the 1940 novel of the same name by George Victor Martin about the Norwegian-American residents of New Hope, Wisconsin, a fictitious small farming community inspired by the real town of Benson Corners in Portage County. The screenplay, written by Dalton Trumbo, was his last before being blacklisted for refusing to testify before the House Un-American Activities Committee; Margaret O'Brien later said that the film was largely ignored for decades because of Trumbo's political troubles.

Told from the viewpoint of little Selma (O’Brien), the film explores grand childhood adventures: making friends, a pet calf, Christmas, a terrifying trip down a flood-swollen river, a barn fire and a ride on a circus elephant’s trunk. Its title comes from Chapter 2, Verse 15 in the Song of Solomon in the King James Version of the Bible, which reads "Take us the foxes, the little foxes, that spoil the vines: for our vines have tender grapes." The quote is also the source of the title of the Lillian Hellman play The Little Foxes and its 1941 film adaptation.

Plot
Martinius Jacobson is a Norwegian immigrant farmer in Wisconsin with his wife Bruna and their seven-year-old daughter Selma, who is often bedeviled by her playmate and five-year-old cousin Arnold. Martinius simply wants to work his land and to be a loving husband and father to his family. His one great ambition is to build a new barn, but tragedy strikes.

Selma lives a carefree, joyous life, which is only temporarily clouded by the sudden death of Ingeborg Jensen, an emotionally disturbed young woman whose stern father had refused permission to attend school despite the pleas of newly arrived schoolmarm Viola Johnson.

The entire town of Fuller Junction comes to the aid of proud Bjorn Bjornson, who has lost his livestock when lightning struck and burned down his newly erected—but uninsured—barn. When Selma generously donates her pet calf to the impoverished farmer, the townspeople in general, and Martinius in particular, follow suit, prompting Viola to reconsider her harsh views on country life and retract her letter of resignation to the school board.

Cast

 Edward G. Robinson as Martinius Jacobson
 Margaret O'Brien as Selma Jacobson
 James Craig as Nels "Editor" Halverson
 Frances Gifford as Viola Johnson
 Agnes Moorehead as Bruna Jacobson
 Morris Carnovsky as Bjorn Bjornson
 Jackie "Butch" Jenkins as Arnold Hanson
 Sara Haden as Mrs. Bjorn Bjornson
 Greta Granstedt as Mrs. Lars Faraassen 
 Dorothy Morris as Ingeborg Jensen 
 Arthur Space as Pete Hanson
 Elizabeth Russell as Mrs. Kola Hanson 
 Louis Jean Heydt as Lars Faraassen 
 Charles B. Middleton as Kurt Jensen 
 Francis Pierlot as Fuller Junction's Minister

Reception 
In a contemporary review for The New York Times, critic Thomas M. Pryor called the film "beautifully made" and wrote: "This is an eloquent and touchingly simple outpouring of the love in a little girl's heart ... If you can watch Margaret O'Brien's ecstatic expression without emotion then 'Our Vines Have Tender Grapes' was not meant for you." Pryor concluded his review by writing: "It is just unfortunate that this splendid entertainment had to arrive so near the end of the school vacation period, for the youngsters (not to overlook their elders) couldn't have asked for anything better."

Accolades
The film was nominated by the American Film Institute for inclusion in its 2006 list AFI's 100 Years...100 Cheers.

References

External links
 
 
 
 
 Solomon's Song of Songs, Book 2

1945 films
1945 drama films
American drama films
American black-and-white films
Films based on American novels
Films directed by Roy Rowland
Films scored by Bronisław Kaper
Films set in Wisconsin
Metro-Goldwyn-Mayer films
Films with screenplays by Dalton Trumbo
Works about Norwegian-American culture
1940s English-language films
1940s American films